Rector Road Bridge is a historic truss bridge in Denton, Texas. It was added to the National Register of Historic Places in 2004.

It is a 5-panel, pinned Pratt through-truss bridge with I-beam approach spans.

It was built by the Austin Brothers Company in 1907-08 to span Clear Creek near Sanger, Texas, costing $1,664.  Frank and George Austin were then the Atlanta and Dallas agents of the George E. King Bridge Company, although they later started their own bridge fabrication plant.

It was later moved to the John Guyer High School at 7501 Teasley Lane in Denton.

Gallery

See also

National Register of Historic Places listings in Denton County, Texas
List of bridges on the National Register of Historic Places in Texas

References

External links

Buildings and structures in Denton County, Texas
Road bridges on the National Register of Historic Places in Texas
Transportation in Denton County, Texas
Pedestrian bridges in Texas
Former road bridges in the United States
National Register of Historic Places in Denton County, Texas